Foxworth is an unincorporated community and Census-designated place in Marion County, Mississippi. It is located near the intersection of U.S. Route 98 and Mississippi Highway 35, approximately three miles southwest of Columbia along the west bank of the Pearl River. The community is named after Frank A. Foxworth, one of the first white settlers in the area.

Foxworth is part of the Marion County School District and is the site of two campuses – West Marion Primary School (Grades K–3), and the shared campus of West Marion Elementary (Grades 4–6), and West Marion High School (Grades 7–12). These serve students in rural areas of western Marion County.

Unincorporated communities in Marion County, Mississippi
Unincorporated communities in Mississippi
Census-designated places in Marion County, Mississippi